Upper Mardi Hydropower Station (Nepali: माथिल्लो मार्दी जलविद्युत आयोजना) is a run-of-river hydro-electric plant located in   Kaski District of Nepal. The flow from Mardi River, a tributary of Gandaki River, is used to generate 7 MW electricity. The design flow is 2.60 m3/s and design gross head is 335 m.

The plant is owned and developed by United Idimardi and R.B. Hydropower Pvt Ltd, an IPP of Nepal. The plant started generating electricity from 2019. The generation licence will expire in 2052, after which the plant will be handed over to the government.  The power station is connected to the national grid and the electricity is sold to Nepal Electricity Authority.

Finance
The project was financed by Prime Commercial Bank Limited in conjunction with Century Commercial Bank and Janata Bank as coalition.

See also

List of power stations in Nepal

References

Hydroelectric power stations in Nepal
Gravity dams
Run-of-the-river power stations
Dams in Nepal
Irrigation in Nepal
2019 establishments in Nepal
Buildings and structures in Kaski District